Events from the year 1951 in Romania. The year saw the Bărăgan deportations.

Incumbents
President of the Provisional Presidium of the Republic: Constantin Ion Parhon.
Prime Minister: Petru Groza.
General Secretary of the Romanian Communist Party: Gheorghe Gheorghiu-Dej.

Events

 30 March – The Securitate is reorganised under the name Direcția Generală a Securității Statului (DGSS).
 18 June – The Bărăgan deportations, during which 44,000 residents from Caraș-Severin, Mehedinți and Timiș County are deported. 2,000 die.
 20 October – The Frederic and Cecilia Cuțescu-Storck Art Museum is opened as a public gallery.
 15 December – The first Five-Year Plan (1951–1955) is adopted by the Great National Assembly; the main objective of the plan is the construction of the Danube–Black Sea Canal.

Popular culture
 In Our Village, directed by Jean Georgescu and Victor Iliu.
 Life Triumphs, directed by Dinu Negreanu.

Births
 14 January – Fița Rafira, middle-distance runner, medal winner at the 1984 Summer Olympics.
 22 July – Dan Ilie Ciobotea, the future Patriarch Daniel of Romania.
 1 September – Nicu Ceaușescu, physicist and communist politician (died 1996).
 4 November – Traian Băsescu, politician and former President of Romania.

Deaths

 14 January – Tancred Constantinescu, engineer and politician, died at Sighet Prison (born 1878).
 15 March – Gheorghe Tașcă, economist, lawyer, academic, diplomat, and politician; a corresponding member of the Romanian Academy, he died at Sighet Prison (born 1875).
 19 April – Ion Manolescu-Strunga, politician, died at Sighet Prison (born 1889).
 22 May – Istrate Micescu, lawyer, died in Aiud Prison (born 1881).
 18 July – Toma Arnăuțoiu, officer who led a group of anti-communist resistance fighters from 1949 to 1958, executed at Jilava Prison (born 1921).
 10 December – Anton Durcovici, bishop of Iași in the Roman Catholic Church and martyr, he died at Sighet Prison and was beatified on 17 May 2014 (born 1888).

References

Years of the 20th century in Romania
1950s in Romania
1951 in Romania
Romania
Romania